The fire-bellied brush-furred rat (Lophuromys nudicaudus)  is a species of rodent in the family Muridae. It is found in Cameroon, Central African Republic, the Republic of the Congo, the Democratic Republic of the Congo, Equatorial Guinea, and Gabon. Its natural habitat is subtropical or tropical moist lowland forests.

References

Lophuromys
Mammals described in 1911
Taxonomy articles created by Polbot